Angela Mao Ying (born Mao Fuching; 20 September 1950) is a Taiwanese actress and martial artist who appeared in martial arts films in the 1970s. One of the most prominent martial artist actresses of her time, she is nicknamed "Lady Whirlwind" and "Lady Kung Fu". She was positioned as a female version of Bruce Lee.

Biography  

Mao was born as Mao Fuching in 1950. She is the daughter of Mao Yung Kang, Peking Opera star, who moved from China to Taiwan in 1949. Her family was originally from Zhejiang province. Angela was originally a Chinese opera actress before becoming an action film actress. At a young age, she attended ballet classes before joining The Fu Shing Peking Opera in 1958.

Mao trained in hapkido and other martial arts at an early age. This would later help her achieve success in martial arts movies. When she was 17, she was discovered by Huang Feng, an action movie director known for discovering Sammo Hung and Carter Wong. Feng was looking for a young woman who knew martial arts to be the leading lady for his upcoming sword fight film, called The Angry River.

With her experience in acting and martial arts, Angela quickly began taking lead roles in other action films in Golden Harvest productions, including Hapkido (Lady Kung-fu), Lady Whirlwind, and The Fate of Lee Khan (directed by King Hu). She was also successful in other movies such as The Association, The Himalayan, and many others.

Internationally, she found fame for her role as the doomed sister of Bruce Lee's character in 1973's Enter the Dragon. Although Bruce Lee died shortly after the production of the movie, Mao was able to train and develop a friendship with him.

Following the incredible success of her short-lived role in Enter The Dragon, many of her films began to be released in the west. Hapkido was the first to gain a wider audience. The film also stars Carter Wong, Sammo Hung, her real life teacher Hwang In-Shik, and also Ji Han Jae. Also working on Hapkido was an uncredited 'bootmaster' Leung Siu-Lung, who was helping Sammo with the fight choreography, and a stuntman named Jackie Chan.

Mao continued with a string of successful movies through the seventies. She and actor Carter Wong became a bit of a kung fu duo act in a series of kung fu classic movies. One of their most popular films is When Taekwondo Strikes, which is also the only film made by Jhoon Rhee. Mao spent time training with Rhee during the making of this movie.  After her Golden Harvest contract expired, she returned to Taiwan and for the next five years continued to make kung fu movies.
 
Mao married Kelly Lai Chen in 1974 and gave birth to a daughter, Hsi Pui Sze, in 1976. They divorced in 1980. She later remarried and had a son, George King, who was born in 1983. She retired from acting in 1992 to devote herself to her family. She moved to New York City in 1993, where she and her family run three restaurants.

Filmography
 
The Angry River (1970) – Lan Feng
Thunderbolt (1970)
 (1971)
Deadly China Doll (1972) – Hei Lu
Hapkido (1972) – Yu Ying
Lady Whirlwind (1972) – Miss Tien
Enter the Dragon (1973) – Su Lin
Back Alley Princess (1973) – Ying
When Taekwondo Strikes (1973) – Wan Ling-ching
The Two Great Cavaliers (1973)
The Fate of Lee Khan (1973)
Naughty! Naughty! (1974)
Stoner (1974) – Angela Li Shou-Hua
The Invincible Kung Fu Trio (1974)
The Tournament (1974)
The Himalayan (1975)
International Assassins (1976) – Queen of Cambodia
Lady Karate (1976)
Duel with the Devils (1977) – Chu
Invincible (1976)
A Queen's Ransom (1976)
The Eternal Conflict (1976) – Fei Fei
Duels in the Desert (1977)
Broken Oath (1977) – Lotus Lin
The Damned (1978)
Iron Maiden (1978) – Chin Lun
Scorching Sun, Fierce Wind, Wild Fire (1978)
Return of the Tiger (1978)
Dance of Death (1979)
Snake Deadly Act (1979) – Brothel Madam
Flying Masters of Kung Fu (1979)
Moonlight Sword and Jade Lion (1981)
The Stunning Gambling (1982)
Ninja, the Violent Sorcerer (1982) – Anna (uncredited)
Book and Sword Chronicles (TV series) (1984) – Luo Bing
Eastern Condors (1987) (extra)
Devil Dynamite (1987)
Ghost Bride (1992)

References

Zhiwei Xiao, Yingjin Zhang: Encyclopedia of Chinese Film. Taylor & Francis, 2002, S. 237
Ric Meyers: Films of Fury: The Kung Fu Movie Book. Eirini Press 2001, S. 172–174
E. K. Padberg: Angela Mao Ying: de kung fu dame – article in a Dutch magazine

External links

The Films on Video of Angela Mao
Hong Kong Information of Angela Mao

Filmography

1950 births
Taiwanese film actresses
Living people
Taiwanese female martial artists
Hapkido practitioners